The Xinren Wang, literally meaning King of the New Stars, is a Go competition in China. It is equivalent to the Shinjin-O in Japan.

Outline
The Xinren Wang is a Go tournament held by the Zhongguo Qiyuan for players under 20 years of age and under 7 dan. In 2007, the age limit was lowered from 30 to 20. The format is a single knockout, and the final is a best-of-3.

The winner's prize is 120,000 RMB the runner-up's prize is 70,000 RMB (as of 2022).

Past winners and runners-up

See also
Shinjin-O

References

External links
 gotoeveryone.k2ss.info

Go competitions in China